Luan Madson Gedeão de Paiva (born 11 August 1990), simply known as Luan, is a Brazilian footballer who currently plays as a forward.

Club career

Early career
Born in São Miguel dos Campos, Alagoas, Luan graduated from Atlético Sorocaba's youth setup, and made his senior debuts in 2008, as his side was crowned champions of Copa Paulista. During his spell at the club he was also the top scorer of both 2011 and 2012 Campeonato Paulista Série A2 campaigns, scoring 25 goals combined.

In July 2011 Luan was a part of Comercial de Ribeirão Preto squad for the club's tour in Europe. He impressed during his time, and was offered a trial at FC Basel; however, the latter and Atlético Sorocaba failed to reach an agreement, and he returned to Brazil. On 1 June 2012 he was loaned to Ponte Preta until December.

Luan made his Ponte – and Série A – debut on 8 July 2013, coming on as a late substitute in a 1–0 home win against Palmeiras. He scored his first professional goal on 14 October, netting the first of a 1–2 away loss against Fluminense.

Atlético Mineiro
On 4 December 2012, the Campinas club bought 40% of Luan's rights from Atlético Sorocaba, for R$ 1.2 million. Four days later, however, he signed a four-year deal with Atlético Mineiro.

Luan became an important figure for Galo after Bernard's departure to FC Shakhtar Donetsk, appearing regularly. He was an important offensive unit for the club during the 2013 Copa Libertadores championship, used mainly as a substitute.

After contributing with seven goals in the 2015 Campeonato Brasileiro Série A, Luan struggled severely with injuries in the following two years. During the 2018 and 2019 campaigns, he was again a regular starter.

V-Varen Nagasaki
On 18 December 2019, Atlético confirmed the transfer of Luan to Japanese club V-Varen Nagasaki, for a rumoured fee of US$ 1.5 million. A regular starter in his first season, he scored seven goals in 31 league appearances as his side suffered relegation.

In the 2021 J2 League, Luan featured sparingly as the club missed out promotion.

Goiás
On 10 February 2022, free agent Luan returned to his home country and signed for Goiás in the top tier.

Career statistics

Honours
Atlético Sorocaba
Copa Paulista: 2008

Atlético Mineiro
Campeonato Mineiro: 2013, 2015, 2017
Copa Libertadores: 2013
Recopa Sudamericana: 2014
Copa do Brasil: 2014

References

External links

Atlético Mineiro profile 

1990 births
Living people
Sportspeople from Alagoas
Brazilian footballers
Association football forwards
Campeonato Brasileiro Série A players
Clube Atlético Sorocaba players
Associação Atlética Ponte Preta players
Clube Atlético Mineiro players
Goiás Esporte Clube players
J1 League players
J2 League players
V-Varen Nagasaki players
Copa Libertadores-winning players
Brazilian expatriate footballers
Brazilian expatriate sportspeople in Japan
Expatriate footballers in Japan